TVN24 BiS (formerly TVN24 Biznes i Świat) is a Polish 24-hour hybrid business and world news channel, sister station to TVN24. It was launched on 1 January 2014, replacing TVN CNBC. TVN24 BiS belongs to the TVN Group which in turn is controlled by the Warner Bros. Discovery. As the world's first hybrid business and International news channel, most of the programmes are a combination of both format, although there are some exceptions.

The channel is available on all digital platforms in Poland (Cyfrowy Polsat and NC+), as well as most cable networks, satellite for viewers in the EU, Europe and around the world. The channel only competitor is Polsat News 2, sister network of Polsat News owned by Polsat which is also a hybrid business news and world news channel, replaced Polsat Biznes.

Programming 
 Fakty (The Facts)
 Fakty po Faktach (The Facts after the Facts)
 Fakty z Zagranicy (The Facts from Abroad)
 Babilon
 Otwarcie Dnia (Opening Day)
 Million w Portfelu (Millions in Wallet)
 Świat Technologii (World Technology)
 Dzień na Świecie (Day on World)
 Biznes dla Ludzi (Business for the People)
 Bilans (Balance)
 24 Godziny (24 Hours)
 24 Godziny po Południu (24 Hours at Noon)
 Tydzień według Jacka (Week by Jack)
 Świat według Jacka (World by Jack)
 Show Biznes (Business Show)
 Piąta strona Świata (World's Market Page)
 Świat o Czwartej (World at 4 O'Clock)
 Świat w Południe (World at Midday)
 Poranek na BIŚ (Morning on BIŚ)
 Kontra-Wersje (Against-Version)

References

External links
 Official website 

TVN (Polish TV channel)
24-hour television news channels
Business-related television channels
Television channels in Poland
Television channels and stations established in 2014
2014 establishments in Poland
Polish-language television stations